Waking Up White: And Finding Myself in the Story of Race is a 2014 non-fiction book about the subject of white privilege written by Debby Irving.

Overview
Author Debby Irving's recollections of her own experiences of being an American white woman and coming to terms with the complexity of race in the United States.

References

External links
 
 Goodreads

2014 non-fiction books
American non-fiction books
Books about race and ethnicity
English-language books
Social privilege
Works about White Americans